Oh, Inverted World is the debut studio album by American indie rock band The Shins, released on June 19, 2001, to critical acclaim. Omnibus Records put out an initial run of vinyl distributed by Darla. Sub Pop Records reprinted the vinyl, but the Sub Pop logo only appears on later pressings.

The album contains the songs "Caring Is Creepy" and "New Slang", both of which appeared in the 2004 film Garden State.

Background 
The album was released several months after its lead single, "New Slang", had debuted. The song garnered substantial critical acclaim to the point where label Sub Pop gave the band a record deal. The album was thus seen as one of the most anticipated indie releases of 2001. Some of the songs on the album existed in an embryonic form back when front man James Mercer was a member of another older band named Flake Music. The aforementioned band was based more in straight-ahead 90's alternative rock like Superchunk, whereas these nascent Oh, Inverted World songs were more inspired by Elephant 6 bands and oldies radio. This mismatch led to Mercer forming The Shins, in which he could explore this divergent sound. 

The song "Know Your Onion!" was based on a saying of Mercer's mother, who would say the idiosyncratic phrase "know your onion!" which referred to having discipline in order to do a job well, with Mercer giving an example by saying "you really gotta know your onion to, I don't know, be an electrician or something." Mercer had said that the song's lyrics are about "getting your shit together and figuring out who are. You know, after high school and all the stupidness of that."

Reception

Oh, Inverted World placed at number 35 on the Pazz & Jop critics' poll for best album of 2001. Online music magazine Pitchfork placed Oh, Inverted World at number 115 on their list of top 200 albums of the 2000s.

Legacy
In a 2003 interview published in the San Francisco Foghorn, the official student newspaper of the University of San Francisco, Mercer was asked whether he was happy with the way Oh, Inverted World came out. Mercer responded by saying "As far as how it sounds, no. I don't know, it was okay. I mean, there are a lot of records that sound more perfect, or close to perfect." In a 2021 retrospective interview, Mercer identified closing track "The Past and Pending" as most likely being his favourite song on the album, stating that "it just works on me probably more than the other songs do."

"Oh, Inverted World" was also the name of a web series created by Terence Krey. Released in November 2010, it was largely inspired by The Shins music as well as other indie artists such as Arcade Fire and The Decemberists. The 13-part sci-fi web series was a story of four twentysomethings returning home from college to find that the Moon is falling into the Earth. The web series was called by The New York Times a "mumblecore Night of the Living Dead".

20th anniversary reissue 
The original mastered audio files for both this album as well as its follow-up Chutes Too Narrow, which were stored on an HP Pavilion in Mercer's home, were stolen in 2003. However, this didn't affect the ability to remaster the album because he still had access to the original masters stored on DATs by the mastering company, and only made it impossible to do remixes (save for "New Slang", the relevant file of which was preserved on a DVD Mercer made). In April 2021, a 20th anniversary reissue of Oh, Inverted World was announced for release on June 11, 2021. The reissue was remastered by Bob Ludwig, with The Shins' James Mercer serving as an assistant, and features new artwork, booklet and packaging.

Track listing

Personnel
Credits are adapted from the album's liner notes.

The Shins
James Mercer – vocals, guitars, keyboards, xylophone, autoharp, programming, harmonium, percussion, harmonica
Marty Crandall – keyboards
Neal Langford – bass
Jesse Sandoval – drums, percussion

Additional musicians
David Hernandez – bass line design and performance 
Melanie Crandall – cello 
Neils Galloway – French horn 

Production
James Mercer – production
The Shins – production 
John Golden – mastering

Artwork
Andrea Leah – design

Charts

Certifications

References

2001 debut albums
The Shins albums
Sub Pop albums